A guiche piercing is a body piercing through the perineum. Guiche piercings are much more common in men than in women.  Although a guiche normally runs perpendicular to the direction of the penis, lateral placements are possible. A series of guiche piercings in parallel to the direction of the penis is called a guiche ladder, and might commonly be seen as an extension of a frenum ladder.

Health issues
Depending on the anatomy of the individual, a guiche piercing can heal quickly with few complications, like a normal piercing, or it may require specialized initial jewelry and care, like a surface piercing. Due to the proximity to the anus, good hygiene is important both during the initial healing period, and on an ongoing basis after the piercing is healed. The estimated healing time for a guiche piercing is between 6 and 9 months. Sitting-related activities that place stress on the region may cause irritation to the site leading to the migration or rejection of the piercing.

Jewelry
Both captive bead rings and barbell-style jewelry are worn in guiche piercings, both as initial jewelry as well as after the piercing has healed.  Guiche piercings can be stretched to large sizes and can accommodate flesh tunnel style jewelry, although the potential discomfort to the bearer may be radically increased. Guiche weights may be attached to the piercing, causing added sexual stimulation.

History and culture
Richard Simonton, also known by his pseudonym Doug Malloy, authored a pamphlet entitled Body & Genital Piercing in Brief which created much of the contemporary mythology surrounding the origin of various body piercings, including the guiche. In the pamphlet guiche piercing is described as originating in the South Pacific, most specifically Tahiti. Simonton's perspectives were coloured by his own enthusiasm for genital piercing as an erotic practice, and his materials are not considered to be accurate.  Like many genital piercings, guiche piercings were primarily practiced in gay BDSM culture, prior to the resurgence of piercing in Western Culture in the late 1980s and early 1990s.

It is sometimes used by couples for advanced power-play, being chained and/or locked to a prince albert piercing for the purpose of male genital infibulation and long term physical control (and the corresponding potent psychological control) over the submissive male through the practice of enforced chastity. In the most extreme cases, both rings are cemented, glued, or even soldered shut for a semi-permanent (removable only within a surgical setting) alternative to a chastity device to be worn over months or years at a time.

See also

 Chastity Piercing

References

External links

 BME Wiki - Guiche piercing

Body piercing